Les Eclaireurs Lighthouse (the French name "Les Éclaireurs" means "the Scouts") is a slightly conically shaped lighthouse standing on the northeasternmost island of the five or more Les Eclaireurs islands, which it takes its name from,  east of Ushuaia in the Beagle Channel, Tierra del Fuego, southern Argentina.

History
Only a door pointing to the west provides access to the building. The lighthouse is still in operation, is remote-controlled, automated, uninhabited  and is not open to the public, guarding the sea entrance to Ushuaia. Electricity is supplied by solar panels. The lighthouse was put into service on December 23, 1920.

It is a popular tourist attraction, reached on short boat tours from Ushuaia.  It is known to the Argentines as the Lighthouse at the End of the World (Faro del fin del mundo), although that name is misleading.  The lighthouse is often confused with the San Juan de Salvamento lighthouse on the east coast of the remote Isla de los Estados, made famous by Jules Verne in the novel The Lighthouse at the End of the World, which is actually much further east.

See also 
 List of lighthouses in Argentina
 Cape Horn

References

External links

 List of Lighthouses in Argentina Servicio de Hidrografía Naval

Lighthouses completed in 1925
Lighthouses in Argentina
Buildings and structures in Tierra del Fuego Province, Argentina
Ushuaia
Tourist attractions in Tierra del Fuego Province, Argentina